Arborglyphs, dendroglyphs, silvaglyphs, or modified cultural trees are carvings of shapes and symbols into the bark of living trees. Although most often referring to ancient cultural practices, the term also refers to modern tree-carving.

Love carvings

Carving names and initials into trees is a common practice among lovers; the carvings can last for decades, as a symbol of the permanence of the couple's love. This practice would appear to date back up to the classical era, with Callimachus writing in his Aetia, "But graven on your bark may ye bear such writing as shall declare 'Cydippe beautiful'" (fragment 73). It also appears in the Eclogues of Virgil: "Resolved am I in the woods, rather, with wild beasts to couch, and bear my doom, and character my love upon the tender tree-trunks: they will grow, and you, my love, grow with them."

This carving was also practised in Renaissance England, as evidenced by the writings of William Shakespeare (in As You Like It, 1599) and John Evelyn (in Sylva, 1664).

Damage to trees

Carving in the bark may damage the tree, by allowing diseases or pests to enter the tree. Bark acts as a protective layer similar to the way skin does in humans, keeping pests and harmful bacteria out of the organism. Breaking the protective layer not only allows disease in, but it may also cause cellular damage if the cut penetrates below the bark, disrupting its ability to transport nutrients through xylem and phloem. Owing to the fungal systems that link some trees, disease may even spread to surrounding trees.

Culturally significant dendroglyphs
People around the world have carved designs in trees imbued with cultural or spiritual significance. These include Aboriginal Australian peoples, including in present-day New South Wales, Western Australia, and Northern Territory. In parts of Latvia and Estonia, some rural-dwelling people carve a cross on a certain tree after someone dies. In the western United States, there are incised drawings on aspens known as arborglyphs, made by shepherds and hunters, and there are carvings made by the Chumash people depicting astronomical features.

Australasia

Boabs in Western Australia

In 2021, a collaborative project to find and trace histories etched in boab trees in the Kimberley region of Western Australia was launched. Researchers from four universities are working with Aboriginal communities and using photogrammetry to record 3D images of carvings on the huge trees, in the first systematic survey of carved boab trees in Australia. In October 2022, the team published the results of their survey of such trees in the Tanami Desert. The survey records the dendroglyphs, which relate to the Lingka Dreaming track across the desert. Also known as the King Brown Snake dreaming, many of the carvings are of snakes, but also include emu and kangaroo tracks; geometric markings; and, further west, crocodiles, turtles and Wanjina figures.

Chatham Islands

In the Chatham Islands (Rēkohu) of New Zealand, the indigenous Moriori people practised the art of momori rakau, or tree carving. The carvings depict Moriori karapuna (ancestors) and symbols of the natural world, such as patiki (flounder) and the hopo (albatross). They are all done on the bark of Corynocarpus laevigatus, or kopi, trees, which have thick, soft bark, and are all located near evidence of settlements in the form of middens.They were done between sometime in the 17th century and around 1835, which is when the Māori people arrived on the island. Most of those seen today were made in the 19th century.

During the 1940s, many fallen trees were found with carvings, in 31 different places on Chatham Island and at Te Puinga on Pitt Island. A survey done in late 1998 found 147 trees with carvings in 5 locations on Rehoa, with 82 trees at Hapapu.

The carvings are mostly images of people, with many of them showing ribs, somewhat similar to the X-ray art found throughout the Pacific region. It has been speculated that at least some of the symbols represent the dead, based on the fact that in some, the figures have their knees pulled up to their chests, in the position that deceased Moriori were buried in dunes. There are also images of animals, such as flounders and birds, and one of a seal was found on Pitt Island. Others showed tree-like symbols and weapons, and many of the trees have horizontal carvings, like rings. 

The best known examples of momori rakau are at JM Barker (Hapupu) National Historic Reserve, where the carvings and trees are protected by a fenced enclosure and the protection of being one of only two National Historic Reserves in New Zealand. The reserve was fenced in 1980 to provide protection for the tree carvings from grazing stock and is now showing good recovery.

North America

Aspen carvings

Aspen carvings are arborglyphs made in the bark of aspen trees by  shepherds, many of them Basque and Irish American, throughout the Western United States. They have been documented across northern California and in areas such as Boise, Idaho and Steamboat Springs, Colorado. Basque immigrants from the Pyrenees came to work as shepherds in the mid-19th century, and, spending long hours alone in forests, etched drawings and poetry into the aspen trees with a knife or even their fingernails. One expert alone has recorded around 20,000 tree carvings across California, Nevada, and Oregon, dating from the early 1900s. The markings turned darker against the pale bark as the tree healed itself. Aspens typically only live around 100 years, but arborglyphs have alsp been found on dead fallen trees. The subject of these carvings range from dates and names to quite detailed drawings, sometimes depicting explicit sexual themes. The carvings often reflect their lonely lives. Wildfires, disease, and natural deterioration are reducing the number of the aspen arborglyphs. 

A grove of aspens with Basque arborglyphs in the Steens Mountain region of southeastern Oregon have been designated as Oregon Heritage Trees.

A project was run by the USDA Forest Service in 1997 to record and study arborglyphs in the Fremont National Forest of southeastern Oregon, near Lakeview.

Chumash arborglyph 
The glyph on the "scorpion tree" (now known as the Chumash Arborglyph) viewed from Painted Rock in Carrizo Plain, California, shows the counterclockwise rotation of stars around Polaris, apparently showing Ursa Major in relation to Polaris.

Paleontologist Rex Saint Onge, who saw the tree in 2006, realised that the tree was carved by Native Americans, specifically Chumash people. The Chumash had painted similar designs on rock formations in California.

Saint Onge waa not the first European American to speculate that Chumash paintings might have astronomical implications. In the 1970s, anthropologist Travis Hudson's book Crystals in the Sky combined his observations of the rock art of the Chumash people with cultural data recorded by ethnographer John P. Harrington nearly a century earlier.

The lower half of the lizard-like image is actually a graphic representation of the movement of a shadow over the course of a year. This was made with a Chumash invention similar to a sundial, in which the stick is aligned with the North Star, and the lines drawn on the rock are traced from the movement of the stick’s shadow on the days of the two solstices and equinoxes, which held cultural significance for the Chumash.

Gallery

References

Further reading

External links

Basque inscriptions
Graffiti in the United States
Western United States
Woodcarving
Trees in religion
Moriori